Gompholobium ovatum is a species of flowering plant in the family Fabaceae and is endemic to the south-west of Western Australia. It is an erect or prostrate shrub with egg-shaped leaves and yellow and red to purple, pea-like flowers.

Description

Taxonomy
Gompholobium ovatum was first formally described in 1844 by Carl Meissner in Lehmann's Plantae Preissianae. The specific epithet (ovatum) means "egg-shaped", referring to the leaves.

Distribution and habitat
This species of gompholobium grows on flats and rocky slopes in the Esperance Plains, Jarrah Forest, Swan Coastal Plain and Warren biogeographic regions of south-western Western Australia.

Conservation status
Gompholobium ovatum is classified as "not threatened" by the Western Australian Government Department of Parks and Wildlife.

References

ovatum
Eudicots of Western Australia
Plants described in 1844
Taxa named by Carl Meissner